At the Edge of the World is a 1927 German silent drama film directed by Karl Grune and starring Albert Steinrück, William Dieterle and Brigitte Helm. It was shot at the Babelsberg Studios in Berlin. Robert Neppach oversaw the film's art direction, designing the sets. The film was so heavily cut by the management of UFA that Grune tried to have his name removed from the credits and publicly criticized them in an open letter.

Cast
 Albert Steinrück as Der Mueller
 William Dieterle as John
 Brigitte Helm as Magda
 Victor Janson as Hauptmann
 Jean Bradin as Leutnant
 Imre Ráday as Geselle
 Max Schreck as Troedler
 Camilla von Hollay as Johns Frau
 Erwin Faber as Stranger
 Georg John
 Fee Malten

References

Bibliography

External links

1927 films
Films of the Weimar Republic
German silent feature films
German drama films
Films directed by Karl Grune
1927 drama films
UFA GmbH films
German black-and-white films
Silent drama films
1920s German films
Films shot at Babelsberg Studios